Anita Joy Dow is an Australian politician and the Deputy Leader of the Opposition. She was elected to the Tasmanian House of Assembly for the Labor Party in the Division of Braddon at the 2018 state election.

She was Mayor of Burnie from 2014 until 2017, and previously worked as a registered nurse.

Following Labor's loss at the 2021 state election, Labor leader Rebecca White and deputy leader Michelle O’Byrne resigned their positions. Dow was elected unopposed as deputy leader.

References

Year of birth missing (living people)
Living people
Australian Labor Party members of the Parliament of Tasmania
Members of the Tasmanian House of Assembly
Women members of the Tasmanian House of Assembly
21st-century Australian politicians
21st-century Australian women politicians
Mayors of places in Tasmania
Women mayors of places in Tasmania
Women deputy opposition leaders
Tasmanian local councillors